The Caribbean Islands Swimming Championships (CISCs) is a biennial aquatics championships held in even years. They are organized by CCCAN and feature age-group competition for teams from Caribbean island nations. They have been held since 1976, and feature competition in 5 of FINA's Aquatics disciplines: swimming, open water, diving, water polo, and synchronized swimming.

Participating Countries
The CISCs predominantly features teams from the Caribbean, but traditionally also includes Guyana and Suriname, members of CONSANAT--South America's Swimming Confederation. 

Twenty (21) countries have been invited to the 2016 Championships:

Residents of the French islands of Guadeloupe and Martinique have also been invited to compete, despite the fact that they technically fall under the jurisdiction of the French Swimming Federation and therefore are considered part of Europe (but geographically are in the Caribbean). Likewise, swimmers from Bonaire, Saba and St. Eustatius (part of the Netherlands), and Saint Martin are also invited.

Championships

CISC Championships records
All records were set in finals unless noted otherwise. All times are swum in a long-course (50m) pool.

Boys (11-12)

Girls (11-12)

Mixed relay (11-12)

Boys (13-14)

Girls (13-14)

Mixed relay (13-14)

Boys (15-17)

Girls (15-17)

Mixed relay (15-17)

Boys (18 & over)

Girls (18 & over)

Mixed relay (18 & Over)

References

External links
CISC records
CISC 2008 website

International swimming competitions
Swimming in the Americas
Swimming in the Caribbean
International sports competitions in the Caribbean
Swimming competitions in the Americas